Alexei Paul de Keyser (21 September 1967 – 28 July 2004) was a British television producer, a son of the British actor David de Keyser.

Early life
He was educated at St Christopher's School, a progressive boarding school in Letchworth, Hertfordshire, and William Ellis School in Highgate, London.  He then studied drama at Hull University, leaving early to work at the Groucho Club in London.

Career
His first role was reading scripts for the independent producer Verity Lambert, and he became her script editor at Cinema Verity, working on popular dramas such as Class Act.  In 1996 he moved to Carlton Television, where he transformed the drama London Bridge into a twice-weekly soap.

De Keyser joined the BBC in 1997 as series script editor for BBC One's popular long-running drama Casualty. He quickly rose to become producer and then series producer in 1998. In 2000 he was made Executive Producer for BBC Drama Series, where he launched the first series of Waking the Dead, which gained an International Emmy nomination in the Best Drama Series category in 2003. He also executive produced two series of the BBC THREE comedy Grease Monkeys.

Personal life
He died at his home on 28 July 2004.

References

External links

Tributes, BBC Press Office, 29 July 2004
Obituary, The Independent, 4 August 2004
Obituary, The Times, 28 August 2004
Obituary, The Guardian, 4 September 2004

1967 births
2004 deaths
British television producers
People educated at William Ellis School
20th-century British businesspeople